Arnold Mitt (born 2 June 1998) is an Estonian professional basketball player who currently  Plays with Rossella Virtus Civitanova in lega basket B

References

External links
Euroleague.net Profile 
Grissin Bon Reggio Emilia bring in Estonian youngster Arnold Mitt

1998 births
Living people
Estonian men's basketball players
Pallacanestro Reggiana players
Sportspeople from Võru
Centers (basketball)
Power forwards (basketball)